Lodzsher togblat or Lodzer togblat ("Łodz Daily", in Polish sources referred to as Łodzier Togbłat and sometimes erroneously as Lodzer Tageblatt) was the oldest Yiddish daily in Poland outside of Warsaw, published in Łodz during 1908-1936. It is not to be confused with German-language Lodzer Tageblatt printed by Leopold Zoner during 1881–1905.

Initially it was published by the publishing house of Mendel Hamburski by ul. Ogrodowa, 3. 

It was suspended during World War I by the occupying German powers for about a year.

In July 1931, a few weeks after the death of Emanuel Hamburski, the newspaper was in a hiatus but later resumed until 1936.

References

Jews and Judaism in Łódź
Publications established in 1908
Publications disestablished in 1936
Defunct newspapers published in Poland
Yiddish newspapers
Jewish Polish history
Secular Jewish culture in Europe
Yiddish-language mass media in Poland